The Israeli ambassadors are posted in New Delhi, India.

List of Ambassadors

Naor Gilon 2021-
Ron Malka 2018 - 2021
Daniel Carmon 2014 - 2018
Alon Ushpiz 2011 - 2014
Mark Sofer 2007 - 2011
David Danieli 2003 - 2007
David Aphek 2000 - 2003
Yehoyada Haim 1995 - 2000
Ephraim Dowek 1992 - 1995

Consulate (Bangalore)
Consul General Jonathan Zadka 2020 -
Consul General Dana Kursh 2017 - 2020
Consul General Yael Hashavit 2015 - 2017
Consul General Menhahem Kanafi 2012 - 2015

Consulate (Mumbai)
Consul General Kobi Shoshani 2021-
Consul General Yaakov Finkelstein 2017 - 2021 
Consul General David Akov 2014 - 2017
Consul General Brett Jonathan Miller 2013 - 2014
Consul General Orna Sagiv 2008 - 2013
Consul General Daniel Zohar-Zonshine 2005 - 2008
Consul General Dov Segev-Steinberg 1999 - 2003
Consul General Walid Mansour 1996 - 1999
Consul General Itzhak Gerberg 1992 - 1996
Consul General Giora Becher 1989 - 1992
Consul General Emanuel Seri 1981 - 1984
Consul General Yair Atan 1971 - 1973 
Consul General Reuven Dafni 1965 - 1969
Consul General Arieh Eilan 1962 - 1963
Consul General Michael Michael (diplomat) 1959 - 1962

References

India
Israel